Thomas Alberti (born 23 June 1998) is an Italian football player. He plays for Serie D club Brusaporto.

Club career
He made his professional debut in Serie C for Bassano, the club he played for in his junior career, in February 2017. For the 2017–18 season, he moved to Serie D club Levico Terme.

In the summer of 2018, he signed with Pisa. On 23 August 2018, he was loaned to Paganese. On 20 July 2019, the loan was extended for the 2019–20 season.

He made his Serie B debut for Pisa on 20 October 2020 in a game against Monza. He substituted Robert Gucher in the 79th minute.

On 5 January 2021, he extended his contract with Pisa until 30 June 2023 and joined Matelica in Serie C on loan until the end of the 2020–21 season.

On 27 August 2021, he moved on loan to Fidelis Andria. On 31 January 2022, Alberti was loaned to Legnago.

References

External links
 

1998 births
People from Asiago
Footballers from Veneto
Living people
Italian footballers
Association football forwards
Bassano Virtus 55 S.T. players
Pisa S.C. players
Paganese Calcio 1926 players
S.S. Fidelis Andria 1928 players
F.C. Legnago Salus players
Serie B players
Serie C players
Serie D players
Sportspeople from the Province of Vicenza